Training Command may refer to:
Albania
Albanian Training and Doctrine Command
Australia
Training Command - Army (TC-A), Australian Army, now part of "Forces Command"
Training Command (RAAF) (1953–2006), now named "Air Force Training Group RAAF"
Bangladesh
Army Training and Doctrine Command 
Canada
Canadian Forces Training Command
India
Army Training Command
Training Command
Korea
Republic of Korea Air Force Education and Training Command
Pakistan
PAF Air Education and Training Command
Serbia
Training Command
Singapore
Training Command (Singapore)
Sri Lanka
Army Training Command (Sri Lanka)
UK
RAF Flying Training Command
RAF Personnel and Training Command
RAF Technical Training Command
RAF Training Command
USA
Air Education and Training Command (since 1993), United States Air Force
Air Training Command (1946–1993), United States Air Force
Army Air Forces Training Command (1943–1946), U.S. Army Air Force
Central Flying Training Command
Central Technical Training Command
Eastern Flying Training Command
Eastern Technical Training Command
Maritime Civil Affairs and Security Training Command
Naval Air Training Command
Naval Education and Training Command
Naval Nuclear Power Training Command
Naval Special Warfare Advanced Training Command
Northwest African Training Command
Recruit Training Command, Great Lakes, Illinois
USAAF Central Technical Training Command
Western Flying Training Command
Western Technical Training Command
108th Training Command (Initial Entry Training) (since 1946), United States Army Reserve